Patriotic hacking is a term for computer hacking or system cracking in which citizens or supporters of a country, traditionally industrialized Western countries but increasingly developing countries, attempt to perpetrate attacks on, or block attacks by, perceived enemies of the state.

Recent media attention has focused on efforts related to terrorists and their own attempts to conduct an online or electronic intifada - cyberterrorism. Patriot hacking is illegal in countries such as the United States yet is on the rise elsewhere. "The FBI said that recent experience showed that an increase in international tension was mirrored in the online world with a rise in cyber activity such as web defacements and denial of service attacks," according to the BBC.

Examples
At the onset of the War in Iraq in 2003, the FBI was concerned about the increase in hack attacks as the intensity of the conflict grew.  Since then, it has been becoming increasingly popular in the North America, Western Europe and Israel. These are the countries which have the greatest threat to Islamic terrorism and its aforementioned digital version.

Around the time of the 2008 Summer Olympics torch relay, which was marred by unrest in Tibet, Chinese hackers claim to have hacked the websites of CNN (accused of selective reporting on the 2008 Lhasa riots) and Carrefour (a French shopping chain, allegedly supporting Tibetan independence),  while websites and forums gave tutorials on how to launch a DDoS attack specifically on the CNN website.

Indian hackers in 2015 took down thousands of Pakistani websites including pakistan.gov.pk and Right To Information Pakistan under the attack named as #OPvijaya under the leadership of In73ct0r d3vil. This attack is considered to be a patriotic move by Indian hackers. Government of India and India's NSA Ajit Dhoval showed support to the attack on his Twitter account.

The official websites of 10 different Indian universities were hacked and defaced in 2017. A group going by the name of ‘Pakistan Haxor Crew’ (PFC) claimed responsibility for the breach, saying it was retaliation for Pakistan’s railway ministry website being hacked by an Indian crew few days before this breach.

See also
 2007 cyberattacks on Estonia
 Black hat hacking
 Exploit (computer security)
 Cyber spying
 Cyber Storm Exercise
 Cyber warfare
 Grey hat
 Hacker (computer security)
 Hacker Ethic
 Hack value
 Hacktivism
 Internet vigilantism
 IT risk
 Metasploit
 Penetration test
 Vulnerability (computing)
 White hat (computer security)

References

Hacking (computer security)
Politics and technology
Cyberwarfare
Cyberattacks
Cybercrime in India
India–Pakistan relations